Michael J. Gibbons (July 20, 1887 – August 31, 1956) was an American boxer from 1908 to 1922. The brother of heavyweight Tommy Gibbons, he claimed Middleweight Champion of the World status in 1909 following Stanley Ketchel's murder. Although he never won the title, Gibbons is regarded as one of the all-time best welter and middleweight boxers by historians. Statistical boxing website BoxRec lists Gibbons as the #18 ranked middleweight of all time, while The Ring Magazine founder Nat Fleischer placed him at #9. The International Boxing Research Organization rates Gibbons as the 17th best middleweight ever and boxing historian Bert Sugar placed him 92nd in his Top 100 Fighters catalogue. Gibbons retired due to deteriorating vision. Following his boxing career he entered business in his native St. Paul, and became a member of the Minnesota Athletic Commission. Gibbons was elected to the Ring Magazine Hall of Fame in 1958, the International Boxing Hall of Fame in 1992, the World Boxing Hall of Fame in 1997, and the Minnesota Boxing Hall of Fame in 2010.

Professional boxing record
All information in this section is derived from BoxRec, unless otherwise stated.

Official record

All newspaper decisions are officially regarded as "no decision" bouts and are not counted in the win/loss/draw column.

Unofficial record

Record with the inclusion of newspaper decisions in the win/loss/draw column.

References

External links

Gibbons' Record at Cyber Boxing Zone
Tom & Mike Gibbons Preservation Society
Boxing Record at BoxRec: Mike Gibbons
Boxing trainer together with Tommy Gibbons in training film "PHYSICAL AND BAYONET TRAINING, 1918 

1887 births
1956 deaths
International Boxing Hall of Fame inductees
Boxers from Saint Paul, Minnesota
American male boxers
Middleweight boxers